Won't Be Blue Anymore is the fifth studio album by American country music artist Dan Seals. It was his most successful studio album; the only one to reach No. 1 on the Top Country Albums chart. The album featured some of Seals most popular songs, including "Bop" and "Meet Me in Montana", a duet with Marie Osmond. These and the third single, "Everything That Glitters (Is Not Gold)", all reached No. 1 on the Hot Country Songs chart. "Bop" was a major crossover hit, peaking at No. 10 on the Hot Adult Contemporary Tracks chart. The compact disc format of this album was released on the album's initial release. It has been out-of-print for more than 20 years and is highly collectible.

Track listing

Personnel 
 Dan Seals – lead and backing vocals
 Barry Beckett – acoustic piano (1, 2, 7, 10), Wurlitzer electric piano (4), electric piano (5)
 Shane Keister – acoustic piano (2, 10), Fairlight CMI (6, 7, 10), synthesizers (9), Yamaha DX7 (10)
 Dennis Burnside – electric piano (3), acoustic piano (8)
 David Innis – synthesizers (8)
 Paul Davis – Synclavier (9), drum programming (9)
 Larry Byrom – electric guitar  (1, 2, 4, 5, 7, 10)
 Jerry Douglas – dobro (1, 2, 4, 7)
 Brent Mason – guitar solo (1)
 Joe Stanley – acoustic guitar (1, 4, 7, 10), electric guitar fills (3), electric guitar solo (4), guitar (9)
 Bobby Thompson – acoustic guitar (1, 4, 5, 7, 10)
 Doyle Grisham – steel guitar (2, 3)
 Rafe Van Hoy – acoustic guitar (2, 3, 11)
 Kenny Mims – electric guitar (3)
 Steve Gibson – electric guitar fills (5), electric guitar (8), guitar (9)
 Larry Shell – acoustic guitar (6)
 Wendy Waldman – acoustic guitar (6), backing vocals (6)
 Greg Jennings – electric guitar (7, 11)
 Sonny Garrish – steel guitar (8)
 Paul Worley – acoustic guitar (8)
 John Porter McMeans – electric guitar (10)
 Bob Gundry – guitar solo (11), acoustic piano (11), LinnDrum programming (11), arrangements (11)
 David Hungate – bass (1, 2, 4, 5, 7, 10, 11)
 Bob Wray – bass (3)
 Michael Rhodes – bass (8)
 Larrie Londin – drums (1, 2, 4, 5, 7, 10, 11)
 Eddie Bayers – drums (3, 8, 11)
 Kyle Lehning – drum programming (9)
 Farrell Morris – percussion (4, 5, 6)
 Mark O'Connor – fiddle (4, 5, 6)
 Jim Horn – saxophone (9)
 Bergen White – string arrangements (8)
 Marie Osmond – lead and backing vocals (8)
 The Cherry Sisters – backing vocals (9)

Production 
 Producer – Kyle Lehning
 Co-Producer on Track 8 – Paul Worley
 Engineers – Joseph Bogan and Kyle Lehning
 Assistant Engineers – Russ Martin and Kirt Odle
 Recorded at Emerald Sound Studios, Audio Media Recorders and Master’s Touch (Nashville, TN); Morningstar Sound Studio (Hendersonville, TN).
 Mixed at The Bennett House (Franklin, TN) and Morningstar Sound Studio.
 Mastered by Doug Sax at The Mastering Lab (Hollywood, CA).
 Art Direction – Henry Marquez
 Design – Carol Chen
 Photography – Alan Dockery and Paul Maxon
 Management – Tony Gottlieb at Morningstar Management.

Charts

Weekly charts

Year-end charts

Singles

Production
Produced by Paul Worley & Kyle Lehning
Engineers: Joseph Bogan, Kyle Lehning, Marshall Morgan, Kirt Odle
Assistant Engineers: Russ Martin, Kirt Odle

Personnel
Dan Seals - lead and backing vocals
Eddie Bayers, Larrie Londin - drums
Farrell Morris - percussion
Paul Davis, Kyle Lehning - drum programming
David Hungate, Michael Rhodes, Bob Wray - bass
Dennis Burnside, Barry Beckett, Dave Innis, Shane Keister - keyboards
Paul Davis - Synclavier
Steve Gibson, Greg Jennings, Brent Mason, Kenny Mims, Dan Seals, Larry Shell, Joe Stanley, Bobby Thompson, Rafe Van Hoy, Wendy Waldman, Paul Worley - guitar
Sonny Garrish, Doyle Grisham - steel guitar
Jerry Douglas - dobro
Jim Horn - saxophone
Mark O'Connor - fiddle
The Cherry Sisters – Diane Tidwell, Sheri Kramer, Lisa Silver - backing vocals (track 9)
Wendy Waldman - backing vocals (track 6)
Bergen White - string arrangements

References

External links
[ Personnel & Production Credits for "Won't Be Blue Anymore" by Dan Seals]

1985 albums
Albums produced by Kyle Lehning
Albums produced by Paul Worley
Dan Seals albums
Capitol Records albums